Dig & Spike Volleyball - known as  in Japan - is a volleyball video game developed by TOSE. The player can choose either two variations: Men's indoor volleyball and Women's beach volleyball.

Teams
The indoor variation is represented by eight men's national volleyball teams, based on teams that played the volleyball tournament in the 1992 Summer Olympics:

Reception

See also
 FIVB World Rankings
 List of volleyball video games

References

External links
 Dig & Spike Volleyball at MobyGames
 Volleyball Twin at superfamicom.org
 バレーボールTwin / Volleyball Twin at super-famicom.jp 

1992 video games
Super Nintendo Entertainment System games
Super Nintendo Entertainment System-only games
Tonkin House games
Tose (company) games
Hudson Soft games
Volleyball video games
Beach volleyball video games
Video games developed in Japan
Video games scored by Yasushi Tokunaga
Multiplayer and single-player video games